The Typhoon H is a 6 rotor multicopter or UAV produced by Yuneec International which was launched in April 2016.

Significant features of the Typhoon H may be summarized as follows
 Ready to fly
 3-axis anti-vibration gimbal camera with full 360° rotation, up to 4k resolution
 Retractable landing gear
 Front facing ultrasonic collision detection with optional INTEL REALSENSE collision avoidance
 Folding rotor arms
 Remote control incorporating built in 7" Android Tablet
 22 minutes flight time
 Choice of 5.8 GHz or 2.4 GHz radio transmission
 ST16 radio transmitter with built in video streaming feed directly from Typhoon H
 CGO3+ 4K lens camera
 Autonomous flight with way points, orbit mode, follow me mode, and tracking mode
 GPS (Global Positioning System)
 Return to home feature which enables the pilot to press return to home and the Typhoon H will fly and land back at its starting point
 Altitude and position holding
 5 rotor mode which enables the pilot to land safely if one motor is damaged during flight
 Durable and quality carbon fiber/hard plastic material

The Typhoon H is considered an upgrade to the DJI Phantom 3 and 4 and Spreading Wings model line as well as the DJI Inspire Pro and is designed specifically for aerial photography and cinematography.

An upgraded version of the Typhoon H that includes a vision based collision avoidance system called 'Intel RealSense' was demonstrated at the CES 2016 trade show.

A key reason why the Typhoon H has been successful in the aerial cinematography world and is often preferred to models like DJI's Phantom and Inspire, is because of the built in Android Tablet to the 2.4ghz transmitter. This provides built in telemetry and direct camera streaming. The drone is also known for its unusually high camera quality out of the box which companies such as DJI have lacked. Although the range on the Typhoon H is not as far as the DJI Phantom lineup, many professional cinematographers have said they prefer the low latency transmission which DJI does not offer. Both drones do operate with full control well beyond eyesight.

Yuneec is now employing Mike McConville, a very famous and long time employee of Horizon Hobby. He is a world famous radio control pilot who is decorated with many awards and accomplishments in the radio control hobby. McConville is one of the first people to use and develop 2.4ghz radio bandwidth in RC technology. He is responsible for the creation of many RC models and drones. He is currently a senior employee at Yuneec International.

Yuneec announced on 9 January 2018 a big brother to the Typhoon H called the Typhoon H Plus. It will be the same design as the original, but with an improved camera, larger frame, and longer flight times.

References

External links 
 http://www.yuneec.com/Typhoon-H

Yuneec aircraft
Unmanned aerial vehicles of China
Unmanned helicopters
Radio-controlled helicopters